Sea Cow Island, also known as Île Vache Marine, is a round 18 ha island on the Great Chagos Bank atoll of the Chagos Archipelago in the British Indian Ocean Territory.

History 
It was named after the dugongs that were once abundant in the area, although they have since become regionally extinct.  It is the smaller of the two islands in the Eagle Islands group on the western side of the atoll and forms part of the Chagos Archipelago strict nature reserve.  It has been identified as an Important Bird Area by BirdLife International because of its significance as a breeding site for brown noddies, of which 11,500 pairs were recorded in a 2004 survey.

The whole shore of this island and some of the interior can be explored through Google Street View.

References

Important Bird Areas of the British Indian Ocean Territory
Seabird colonies
Chagos Archipelago
Nature reserves